Arıkören station is a station in Arıkören in Turkey, on the Konya-Yenice railway. It is serviced by the Taurus Express and the Konya-Karaman Regional, which the later serves as a connecting train to Karaman for YHT trains terminating in Konya. The station was opened on 25 October 1904 by the Baghdad Railway.

References

External links
Station timetable

Railway stations in Konya Province
Railway stations opened in 1904
1904 establishments in the Ottoman Empire
Çumra